The World's Greatest SuperFriends is an American animated television series about a team of superheroes which ran from September 22, 1979, to September 27, 1980, on ABC. It was produced by Hanna-Barbera Productions and is based on the Justice League and associated comic book characters published by DC Comics.

Summary
This particular incarnation of Super Friends relied heavily on folklore and classic fairy tales for plots. One episode in particular, "The Lord of Middle Earth", was inspired by the novel The Lord of the Rings, in which the team journeys to Middle-earth to save the inhabitants from an evil wizard. The series also borrowed from (then) contemporary politics, as the main villain Kareem Azar in "Rub Three Times for Disaster" is almost a carbon copy of the late Iranian religious leader Ayatollah Ruholla Mussaui Khomenei (1900–1989).

Some fans refer to this season as the "Absentee Super Friends season", as a number of the episodes have members who only appear in cameos, or not at all.

"Rub Three Times For Disaster" - Full group appears.

"Lex Luthor Strikes Back" - Zan & Jayna (the Wonder Twins) and Gleek are seen only in cameos at the beginning and end of the episode.  They spend the rest of the episode visiting their home planet of Exor.

"Space Knights of Camelon" -  Full group appears.

"Lord of Middle Earth" -  Full group appears, but the Wonder Twins are only seen at the beginning and end of the episode, and briefly in the middle.

"Universe of Evil" -  The "evil" version of Gleek is only seen in a group shot.

"Terror At 20,000 Fathoms" - Superman has a brief cameo at the beginning, and states he must fly to Saturn and meet Wonder Woman, who isn't seen at all.

"The SuperFriends Meet Frankenstein" - Aquaman and the Wonder Twins are not seen this episode, they are visiting the city of Atlantis although Gleek is in this episode.

"The Planet of Oz" - Batman, Robin, the Wonder Twins, and Gleek are only seen at the very beginning and end of the episode.

Characters
 Superman – The Supermobile appeared in the episode "Lex Luthor Strikes Back". In the episode "Terror at 20,000 Fathoms", Superman gives Aquaman, the Wonder Twins and Gleek a guided tour of the Fortress of Solitude showing off many structures such as the Bottle City of Kandor.
 Batman
 Robin
 Wonder Woman - She remained in her animated form throughout the Super Friends series after CBS ended her live action television series.
 Aquaman
 Wonder Twins
 Gleek

Episodes

Cast
 Marlene Aragon - Wicked Witch of the Worst-Kind (in "The Planet of Oz")
 Michael Bell – Zan, Gleek, Hellion (in "Lex Luthor Strikes Back"), Gore (in "The SuperFriends Meet Frankenstein"), Logan (in "Space Knights of Camelon"), Kareem Azar's Henchman (in "Rub Three Times for Disaster"), Evil Gleek (in "Universe of Evil"), Frightened Citizen (in "The SuperFriends Meet Frankenstein")
 William Callaway – Aquaman, Orville Gump (in "Lex Luthor Strikes Back"), Evil Aquaman (in "Universe of Evil"), Frightened Citizen (in "The SuperFriends Meet Frankenstein")
 Danny Dark – Superman, Rebel (in "Space Knights of Camelon"), Soldier (in "Rub Three Times for Disaster"), Evil Superman (in "Universe of Evil"), Carron (in "Terror at 20,000 Fathoms")
 Shannon Farnon – Wonder Woman, Lois Lane (in "Lex Luthor Strikes Back"), Camelon Villager (in "Space Knights in Camelon"), Evil Wonder Woman (in "Universe of Evil"), Sergeant Ritter (in "Universe of Evil"), Dorrell (in "Terror at 20,000 Fathoms"), Dr. Pali (in "The SuperFriends Meet Frankenstein")
 Pat Fraley - Sir James (in "Space Knights of Camelon"), Rebel (in "Space Knights of Camelon")
 Bob Holt - Taskmaster (in "The Lord of Middle Earth"), Gorka (in "The Lord of Middle Earth), Captain Nemoy (in "Terror at 20,000 Fathoms"), Wizard of Oz (in "The Planet of Oz")
 Stan Jones - Lex Luthor (in "Lex Luthor Strikes Back"), Kareem Azar (in "Rub Three Times for Disaster"), Fortress Guard (in "Rub Three Times for Disaster"), Submarine Captain (in "Rub Three Times for Disaster"), Computer Override Circuit (in "Terror at 20,000 Fathoms"), Dr. Frankenstein (in "The SuperFriends Meet Frankenstein"), Frightened Citizen (in "The SuperFriends Meet Frankenstein")
 Casey Kasem – Robin, Kareem Azar's Henchman (in "Rub Three Times for Disaster"), Evil Robin (in "Universe of Evil")
 James Reynolds - African Leader (in "Terror at 20,000 Fathoms"), Mivor (in "Terror at 20,000 Fathoms")
 Stanley Ralph Ross - Frankenstein's Monster (in The SuperFriends Meet Frankenstein"), Super Monster (in "The SuperFriends Meet Frankenstein"), Mal Havoc (in "The Lord of Middle Earth"), Genie of Olam (in "Rub Three Times for Disaster")
 Michael Rye - King Arthur 7 (in "Space Knights of Camelon"), Ogar (in "Space Knights of Camelon"), Kareem Azar's Henchman (in "Rub Three Times for Disaster"), Scientist (in "Rub Three Times for Disaster")
 Olan Soule – Batman, Dr. Simms (in "The SuperFriends Meet Frankenstein"), O'Brien (in "Rub Three Times for Disaster"), London Citizen (in "Rub Three Times for Disaster"), Evil Batman (in "Universe of Evil"), Android Batman (in "Terror at 20,000 Fathoms"), Joseph's Friend (in "The SuperFriends Meet Frankenstein"), Magic Mirror (in "The Planet of Oz")
 Vernee Watson-Johnson - Uninversity Scientist (in "Universe of Evil")
 Frank Welker - Spider Creature (in "The Lord of Middle Earth"), Mister Mxyzptlk (in "The Planet of Oz"), Crows (in "The Planet of Oz"), Wild Boars (in "The Planet of Oz"), Hour Glass Cult Members (in "The Planet of Oz")
 Liberty Williams – Jayna, Kana (in "Terror at 20,0000 Fathoms")
 William Woodson – Narrator, The Sultan of Zagdad (in "Rub Three Times for Disaster"), Kareem Azar’s Henchman (in “Rub Three Times for Disaster”), Vol (in "Lex Luthor Strikes Back"), Warden McGee (in "Lex Luthor Strikes Back"), Little William (in "Space Knights of Camelon"), Poor Camelon Villager (in "Space Knights of Camelon"), Baldiskam (in "The Lord of Middle Earth"), South American Villager (in "Universe of Evil"), Air Force General (in "Terror at 20,000 Fathoms), Joseph (in "The SuperFriends Meet Frankenstein"), Dreadsylvania Official (in "The SuperFriends Meet Frankenstein")

DC Super Friends
The main title theme for the direct-to-video original animation DC Super Friends: The Joker's Playhouse (2010) is from the World's Greatest SuperFriends.

Home media
The complete season four was released on DVD titled The World's Greatest Super Friends: And Justice for All as a Target exclusive on April 23, 2013. It was scheduled to be a general retail release ("at all sellers who decide to participate") starting November 12, 2013.

References

External links
 The World's Greatest Super Friends at Big Cartoon DataBase
 
 The World's Greatest SuperFriends @ Legions of Gotham

1979 American television series debuts
1980 American television series endings
1970s American animated television series
1980s American animated television series
1970s American science fiction television series
1980s American science fiction television series
American animated television spin-offs
American children's animated adventure television series
American children's animated science fantasy television series
American children's animated superhero television series
American Broadcasting Company original programming
Animated Batman television series
Animated Justice League television series
Animated Superman television series
Wonder Woman in other media
Super Friends
Animated television shows based on DC Comics
Television series about shapeshifting
Television series by Hanna-Barbera
Television series set in 1979
English-language television shows